The 2004–05 Czech 2. Liga was the 12th season of the 2. česká fotbalová liga, the second tier of the Czech football league. In February 2005, Bohemians lost their license to play in the league and thus their results were expunged and the second half of the season was played with only 15 teams.

Team changes

From 2. Liga
Promoted to Czech First League
 FK Mladá Boleslav
 FK Drnovice

Relegated to Bohemian Football League
 SC Xaverov

Relegated to Moravian–Silesian Football League
 1. HFK Olomouc

To 2. Liga
Relegated from Czech First League
 FK Viktoria Žižkov
 FC Viktoria Plzeň

Promoted from Bohemian Football League
 MFK Ústí nad Labem

Promoted from Moravian–Silesian Football League
 SK Hanácká Slavia Kroměříž

League standings

Top goalscorers

See also
 2004–05 Czech First League
 2004–05 Czech Cup

References

Official website 

Czech 2. Liga seasons
Czech
2004–05 in Czech football